William Irwin Krisher (born September 18, 1935) is a former American football guard who was an All-American at Oklahoma in 1956 and 1957.  Krisher played two seasons in the American Football League (AFL), from 1960 to 1961, for the Dallas Texans.  He was All-AFL in 1960  and an AFL Western Division All-Star in 1961.

See also
 List of American Football League players

References

1935 births
Living people
American football offensive guards
Dallas Texans (AFL) players
Oklahoma Sooners football players
Pittsburgh Steelers players
All-American college football players
American Football League All-Star players
People from Perry, Oklahoma
Sportspeople from Oklahoma County, Oklahoma
Players of American football from Oklahoma